Decatur High School could refer to:

Decatur High School (Alabama) — Decatur, Alabama
Decatur High School (Arkansas) — Decatur, Arkansas
Decatur High School (Georgia) — Decatur, Georgia
Stephen Decatur High School (Decatur, Illinois), (1911–2000)
Decatur High School (Michigan) — Decatur, Michigan
Decatur High School (Texas) — Decatur, Texas
Decatur High School (Federal Way, Washington) — Federal Way, Washington
Decatur Central High School — Indianapolis, Indiana
Stephen Decatur High School (Maryland) — Berlin, Maryland